Nanodectes is a genus of Australian insects in family Tettigoniidae.

Species
It contains the following species:
 Nanodectes bulbicercus
 others ...

References 

Tettigoniidae genera
Taxonomy articles created by Polbot
Taxobox binomials not recognized by IUCN